Feyzabad (also Romanized as Feyẕābād and Faizābād) is a village in Chahak Rural District, in the Central District of Khatam County, Yazd Province, Iran. At the 2006 census, its population was 31, in 8 families.

References 

Populated places in Khatam County